David Roas (1965 in Barcelona) is a Spanish writer and literary critic, specialising in fantastic literature. He is currently professor of Literary Theory and Comparative Literature at the Autonomous University of Barcelona, where he heads up the Fantastic Literature Studies Group (Grupo de Estudios sobre lo Fantástico – GEF).

Roas has been described by the writer and journalist, Rubén Sánchez Trigos as "probably [Spain's] leading specialist in fantastic literature". His most recent collection of short stories was published by Editorial Páginas de Espuma, Madrid, in April 2018. In the words of Jose Oliva, in this latest collection Roas establishes "a permanent dialogue in the form of homages to other authors, such as Cristina Fernández Cubas, Rod Serling (of The Twilight Zone fame), Mercedes Abad, Eduardo Berti, or parodying George A. Romero." In this regard he has commented, "I don't know how to write in a vacuum. I read fantastic literature."

Bibliography
Fiction
 Los dichos de un necio (Manresa, 1996)
 Celuloide sangriento (Diari de Sabadell, 1996)
 Horrores cotidianos (Palencia, 2007 y Lima 2009) 
 Distorsiones (Páginas de Espuma, Madrid 2010)
 Intuiciones y delirios (Editorial Micrópolis, Lima, 2012)
 La estrategia de koala (Candaya, Barcelona, 2013)
 Bienvenidos a Incaland (Páginas de Espuma, Madrid, 2014)
 Invasión (Páginas de Espuma, Madrid, 2018)

Non-fiction
 Teorías de lo fantástico (Arco Libros, Madrid, 2001)
 Enrique Jardiel Poncela (Eneida Editorial, Madrid, 2001) (Biography, co-authored with Fernando Valls)
 Hoffmann en España (Biblioteca Nueva,Madrid, 2002)
 De la maravilla al horror, Los orígenes de lo fantástico en la cultura española (1750-1860) (Mirabel, Vilagarcía de Arousa, 2006)
 La sombra del cuervo. Edgar Allan Poe y la literatura fantástica española del siglo XIX (Madrid, 2011)
 Tras los límites de lo real. Una definición de lo fantástico (Madrid, 2011).
 Meditaciones de un arponero (E.D.A., Málaga, 2008)
 La sombra del cuervo. Edgar Allan Poe y la literatura fantástica española del siglo XIX (Devenir, Madrid, 2011)
 Tras los límites de lo real. Una definición de lo fantástico. (Páginas de Espuma, Madrid, 2011)

Anthologies (as editor)
 El castillo del espectro. Antología de relatos fantásticos españoles del siglo XIX (Barcelona, 2002)
 Cuentos fantásticos del siglo XIX (España e Hispanoamérica) (Madrid, 2003)
 La realidad oculta. Cuentos fantásticos españoles del siglo XX (Palencia, 2008) - with Ana Casas

Awards 
 Setenil Award, 2011 for Distorsiones

References 

People from Barcelona
Short story writers from Catalonia
1965 births
Living people
Academic staff of the Autonomous University of Barcelona
Spanish male short story writers
Anthologists